Ambinany is a town and commune in Madagascar. It belongs to the district of Sakaraha, which is a part of Atsimo-Andrefana Region. The population of the commune was estimated to be approximately 5,000 in 2001 commune census.

Primary and junior level secondary education are available in town. The majority 55% of the population of the commune are farmers, while an additional 43% receives their livelihood from raising livestock. The most important crop is rice, while other important products are maize and cassava.  Services provide employment for 1% of the population. Additionally fishing employs 1% of the population.

References and notes 

Populated places in Atsimo-Andrefana